Route 15 is a bus route in Aberdeen operated by First Aberdeen. It operates every half hour.

History 
Route number 15 was formerly allocated to a route via Union Street between the beach and either Craigiebuckler or Airyhall. In July 2022, this route was withdrawn as part of a wider timetable change that saw a new route 15 introduced between Countesswells and Balnagask. The changes were met with criticism as it left Footdee without a bus service.

The new route to Countssells was also criticised as local residents claimed that Countesswells Road is too narrow for buses to pass other vehicles safely. First conducted a site visit in July 2022 and stated they deemed the road to be suitable.

References 

15
15